Hildebert (fl. 882), was Count of Ivois, the successor to his father Bérenger I.  Almost nothing is known about Hildebert other than a donation in his father's name to Saint-Vanne Abbey in Verdun in 882.  The necrology of Verdun Cathedral records the death of Hildebertus comes [Count Hildebert] which is the only historical record of his being a count.

In other texts his name is mentioned as Hildo of Ivois (In latin: Hildonis/Hildus).

References 

Medieval Lands Project, Comtes de Ivois et Woevre

Counts of Ivois
Year of death unknown
Year of birth unknown
Place of birth unknown